Homer Glen is a village, located  southwest of downtown Chicago, in Homer Township, Will County, Illinois. It is a southwest suburb of Chicago. Per the 2020 census, the population was 24,543.  The village was incorporated on April 17, 2001. The area that is now Homer Glen was formerly known as "Goodings Grove". Prior to 1988, the unincorporated Homer Township-Goodings Grove area consisted of sparsely populated wetlands, and was home to only a few small housing developments. Despite its recent growth, Homer Glen continues to be one of the most rural areas of Will County in the Des Plaines Valley.

Geography
Homer Glen is located at 41°37′22″N 87°56′29″W (41.6228,-87.9416).

The boundaries of the village of Homer Glen are one half-mile block south of 131st Street to the north (along the Cook County border); 183rd Street to the south; Will-Cook Road to the east; and Gougar Road to the west. The village shares its boundaries with the village of Lemont (in Lemont Township, Cook County) to the north, the village of Orland Park (in Orland Township, Cook County) to the east, the village of New Lenox (in New Lenox Township, Will County) to the south and the city of Lockport (in Lockport Township, Will County) to the west. The three major roads in Homer Glen are Bell Road, which runs North-South, 143rd Street, and 159th Street, which both run East-West.

Many streets in Homer Glen end in large, circular cul-de-sacs. Overnight parallel parking in the village is prohibited; vehicles and trailers parked on a cul-de-sac must be parked facing the curb.

Demographics

2020 census

Note: the US Census treats Hispanic/Latino as an ethnic category. This table excludes Latinos from the racial categories and assigns them to a separate category. Hispanics/Latinos can be of any race.

2010 Census
As of the 2010 census, there were 24,220 residents. The racial composition of the city was:
 95.5% White (91.7% non-Hispanic whites);
 0.6% Black or African American;
 1.0% from some other race;
 1.7% Asian 
 1.1% from two or more races.
Homer Glen has a Hispanic or Latino population of 4.9%.
 
Homer Glen has a  significant Polish and Lithuanian population.  There are many Polish delis, grocery stores, and other businesses throughout the Homer Glen and the nearby areas. There is also a population of Serbians living in the Homer Glen area.

Government
The current mayor is George Yukich.

Education
There are two grade school districts and one high-school district serving the village. Homer Community Consolidated School District 33C serves most of the community, and Will County School District 92 serves the rest. Lockport Township High School, District 205, is the public high school serving the village.

Recreation
Homer Glen has many parks and athletic clubs, including the Homer Athletic Club, Homer Stallions Football and Lacrosse, Homer Heat Baseball, Illinois Crush Baseball, Lockport Homer Swim Club, and Homer Hawks soccer. The Village finished construction of its first trail system, the Homer Glen Heroes Trail, in late 2011. The trail is dedicated to local heroes and individuals that have made a positive impact on the community. The first event to take place on the Trail was the Mike Hike 5k, which honored local resident PFC Michael C. Olivieri, who lost his life while serving in Iraq in June 2011.

Religion
Homer Glen is the location of Annunciation of the Mother of God Ruthenian Greek Catholic Church. This church has been awarded for its "green" initiatives, specifically its  of landscaping that focuses on native plant life and water retention / management.  Annunciation is notably one of the few new parishes of the Byzantine Catholic Metropolitan Church of Pittsburgh.

Homer Glen is home to St. Bernard's Parish and Our Mother of Good Counsel Parish, both Roman Catholic churches. It is also home to 15 other churches of the Christian faith.

Homer Glen is also home to the St. John Serbian  Orthodox  Church. 

Homer Glen is the site of the Sri Ramakrishna Universal Temple, a branch of the Vivekananda Vedanta Society of Chicago.

Media
Homer Glen is part of the Chicago metropolitan area media market for television, radio, and newspaper coverage. The Chicago Tribune and the Chicago Sun-Times, and also the Joliet Herald are widely available. The news of Homer Glen itself was primarily covered by The Homer Horizon newspaper which had a circulation of approximately 13,400 homes and businesses in Homer Glen and neighboring Lockport.  The Homer Horizon was focused solely on the coverage of Homer Township and was a publication of 22nd Century Media, which was based in Orland Park.

See also
 Goodings Grove, Illinois
 List of towns and villages in Illinois

References

http://www.chicagotribune.com/news/local/sns-ap-il--illinoisgovernor-rally,0,4866258.story

External links
 Homer Glen official website
 Homer Glen EMA
 Homer Township Public Library website
 Lockport Township High School website
 Will County website

Villages in Will County, Illinois
Villages in Illinois
Populated places established in 1836
1836 establishments in Illinois